Sean Ellis is an entrepreneur, angel investor, and startup advisor. He is the founder of GrowthHackers and was previously founder and CEO of Qualaroo, an automated user research tool.

He attended the University of California, Davis and graduated in 1994.

Career
Ellis was the head of marketing at LogMeIn and Uproar from launch to IPO. He was the first marketer at Dropbox, Lookout and Xobni.

He is an advisor to KISSmetrics and Eventbrite, mentor at 500 Startups, and a Board Member for Mavenlink and SignNow (acquired by Barracuda Networks). He also is an investor in Bitium.

Ellis has contributed to Entrepreneur Magazine and The Wall Street Journal.

References

External links
 Official website

American Internet celebrities
American male bloggers
American bloggers
American technology company founders
University of California, Davis alumni
Living people
Year of birth missing (living people)